Gornji Milanovac is a town and municipality located in the Moravica District of central Serbia. The population of the town is 24,216, while the population of the municipality is 44,406.

The town was founded in 1853. Before 1859 the original name of the town was Despotovica, after the Despotovica river passing by the town. In 1859 the name was changed to Gornji Milanovac at the request of the Prince of Serbia Miloš Obrenović. Its name means Upper Milanovac (there is a Lower Milanovac as well, while Milanovac stems from the name Milan in Serbian).

History
Initially, the settlement that was to become Gornji Milanovac (before 1853) was situated in the area of today's village Brusnica. There was some discussion about the suitability of the site for a settlement. The new municipality was to be called Despotovac after the river Despotovica which passes through this municipality (the river name originates from the Serbian despot, Đurađ Branković). On the 22nd of April 1852, Despotovac (later Gornji Milanovac) was then relocated to a place called Divlje Polje. This decision was taken by Mladen Žujović, Trivun Novaković, Stevan Knićanin, and Gaja Riznić. Notable buildings and roads (for example: "Zgrada starog suda – Old Court building") are the work of German engineer Indižir Schultz from Pančevo. Today's name Gornji Milanovac was formalized by the warrant of Miloš Obrenović I, Prince of Serbia, in 1859, after his brother Milan Obrenović.

The location of Gornji Milanovac confirms that this area was settled in prehistory and we can find settlements of Illyrians, Thracians, Dacians, small groups of Celts and Goths and bigger settlements of the Romans. On the mountain Rudnik, besides older miners grove there are remains of a Roman temple dedicated to the Terra Mater ("Mother Earth"). There is little information about Slavs and their settlements.

Even in the Middle Ages and the time of the Roman Empire, the area around Gornji Milanovac was significant in economic, agronomy, infrastructure, and military sense. There are sites from the Neolithic period (in the village Gojna Gora) and pre/post-Roman governance period (Rudnik), also ruins and sites from Byzantine administration, Medieval Serbian Principality/Kingdom, Serbian Empire and Ottoman Empire  (on mountain Rudnik, in villages Brusnica, mountain Treska, Jablanica, and Gornji Milanovac parts of the mountain Vujan ).

This town was significant during the First Serbian Uprising against Ottoman Empire rule, but more so during the Second Serbian Uprising. In 1814, Takovo had reached a historical agreement about the Second Serbian Uprising. In front of the family house of Obrenović in the village Gornja Crnuća, he raised a flag (red Greek cross on the white background) and said:

In the World War I occupation, the population in Gornji Milanovac was subjected to war terror and crimes by the forces of Austria-Hungary, Kaiser's Germany and Bulkaria, while during World War II the infrastructure was destroyed and the population of this town suffered as before. At the time of sanctions and breakup of Yugoslavia, the industry of municipality exported their products to the Western and Eastern markets through offshore companies. In 1999 NATO bombing of Yugoslavia, Gornji Milanovac was bombed once (only television repeater was damaged). People from nearby towns and municipalities in-joke said, that when NATO planned which town to bomb, they put a cup of coffee at the Gornji Milanovac location on the map.

Important years and dates:
1814– The beginning of the Second Serbian Uprising was agreed in Takovo village
1852– Gornji Milanovac (in that time Despotovica) becomes the first town in Serbia with a completed map of the city and with the streets at an angle of 90°; 
1853– establishment municipality of Despotovica;
1857– the establishment of the first men's and girls' primary school and the first library;
1859– changing the name of the municipality in Gornji Milanovac;
1879– the establishment of the First High School;
1890– first printing company start to work;
1892– the establishment of county hospital;
1912– commencement of construction of narrow-gauge railway;
1914– during the First World War in this town was settled headquarters of Živojin Mišić;
1921– finished electrification and construction of low voltage network;
1922– started with work of the narrow gauge railway and establishment of the first conditory company "Rudnik";
1923– first coal power plant;
1927– first X-ray machine;
1928– started with work of the first cinema in a municipality;
1933– HRH King Alexander I of Yugoslavia opens first mixed primary school;
1937– The establishment of the second factory of conditory products "Sumadija";
1941– Yugoslav Partisans and Yugoslav army in homeland (known as Chetniks) in joint action release Gornji Milanovac from the Nazi- German occupation. Gornji Milanovac was merged with the other released towns in occupied Kingdom of Yugoslavia and formed short-lived Republic of Užice. At the head of that joint action was Zvonimir Vučković. During that battle two German tanks were trapped and now one of those is a monument on the exit from the town in village Nevade, while the other is a monument in Užice (Hotchkiss H35);
1945– Gornji Milanovac was released from Nazi-German occupation and began industrialization
1965– two municipalities Pranjani and Rudnik merged to Gornji Milanovac.

Culture and tourism

Cultural monuments

Cultural Monuments of Great Importance in Gornji Milanovac are:
 Church of the Holy Trinity.
 Church of St. Nicholas in the village of Brusnica and the family tomb of Obrenović dynasty. 
 District Building ("The Old Court building").
 Monuments in the center of the municipality.
 "Hill of Peace" (Brdo mira) Memorial Park.
 Tank as a monument of liberation in Nevade from the Second World War (Sherman Firefly).
 Orthodox Christian monasteries of Vraćevšnica, Šilopaj and Vujan.
 Takovo complex devoted to the heroes from Second Serbian Uprising.
 Ruins of Orthodox monasteries "Ješevac", Catholic church "Misa" (later mosque) on Rudnik.
 Ruins of Irene Kantakouzene on Treska Hill.
 Family house of Miloš Obrenović in Gornja Crnuća.
 Family house of national hero Dragan Jeftić-Škepo.
 Family house of the Lunjevica family (Revolutionary Nikola, politician Panta and Queen consort Draga Obrenović).
 Family house of Djordjevic built in old Serbian architectural style.
 Family house and inheritance of Archibald Reiss's son- "Dobro polje II".
 Monument on city cemetery of fallen soldiers of Austro-Hungary and Serbian Army in World War I.
 Monument for the participants in Operation Halyard and the other monuments in the rest of municipality.

Culture institutions 

The first library in Gornji Milanovac was established in 1857 and is called "Braća Nastasijević" (English: "Brothers Nastasijević"). Headquarters is in the building of Old District Administration. It has separate classes in Rudnik (the oldest), Pranjani, Brdjani, and Vraćešnica. Librarian fond has over 100,000 books. Also "Braća Nastasijević" library is engaged in the publishing business.

The main theater in this municipality is "Milanovačko amatersko pozorište (Milanovac amateur theater)". Milanovac amateur theater, GM cinema, art gallery and administrative center of all settlements cultural clubs has headquarters in the center of municipality witch satisfy modern standards for one cultural institution. In the area of photography and cinema, Gornji Milanovac is represented with a big number of art members of the Photo-cinema club Gornji Milanovac.

The Museum of Rudnik and Takovo area is a subsidiary of the culture center of Gornji Milanovac. It has established the Gallerie of Arts in 2008, and a modern gallery in the building of old district administration.

Music and folklore
In this municipality there are two folklore groups: "Tipoplastika"-Folklore ensemble and Culture-Arts Community "Šumadija". There are also rock bends that were established in this town, like: "Bjesovi", "An Fas", ″Pastir Pan″, "GM Undergrounders", "Skarlet" and "Čudna Šuma". As for punk-rock bands in '90s and 80's there are: "Trula koalicija", In '00s there were established new rock and reggae music bands and groups: "Plišani mališan", "Morbid Cow", "Parnasus", "Strah od Džeki Čena", IMT 666 (Featuring Bjesovi band's singers child, Stevan Marinkovic), etc.

Tourism, ecology and events 

Whilst part of Yugoslavia, Gornji Milanovac was known as the "economic miracle" and "Beli Labud" (English: "White Swan") as the ecologically cleanest city. There is great potential for further rural and spa (Svračkovci, Brđani, Mlakovac and Savinac) tourism progress in future times. Today's Gornji Milanovac on its territory has a lot of small, categorized rural hotels, one hostel and motels. Close to Gornji Milanovac is a spa and resort "Atomska Banja" Donja Trepča. Major Hotels in this town are newly opened hotel "IG Hotel" (4 stars) and "MD Neda" (3 stars) in the settlement Rudnik. In the past, there was one of the biggest hotels "Šumadija"  (3 stars) bankrupted in 2004.

Gornji Milanovac was a pioneer in the application of sorting waste, recycling and water purification in Serbia and previously in Yugoslavia. Also, Gornji Milanovac is a great antagonist of GM food why it has adopted declaration and municipality statute about prohibition of this type of food.

Tourists from around the world visit this municipality for its clean air, small and quiet places, inner and family vacations. Gornji Milanovac every other year is the host of International Biennial of miniature Art, founded in 1989. In village Takovo is the host of the World Music Festival, every May, June or July. Known trip places are: Takovo, Grabovica (peak of Ždreban), Savinac and Rudnik. These places are popular during the celebration of the May 1st or world-known International Workers' Day as a collegial picnic in union organization. Other significant cultural and tourism events on its territory are World Testicle Cooking Championship, the "Milanovac bowl tournament" (Fish soup cooking) and the Goulash tournament ("Gulašijada"). In some settlements are held various art colonies. Also, there are held and village gymnastic competition in some disciplines during the celebration of some patron day of that village.

Gornji Milanovac is a touristic sense has to offer to the lovers of bright starry nights (in December–January and May–June) and beautiful sunrises, various monuments, clean air, healing water resources and much more. It has a reputation for offering a vibrant nightlife which is also developed and safer than in the rest of Serbia. On the January, 7th ( Orthodox Christmas) Gornji Milanovas Tourist organization and its citizens (transport operators companies, local company owners, farmworkers, musician and orchestra artist, motorcycle and ATV clubs, taxi drivers, firefighters, police and military) every year organize the one-day festival, because it's believed that if they start something on that holiday they will succeed in all days in that year.

Also in Gornji Milanovac are 3 fairs per year, on May 22, August 2 and October 15. After 70 years Gornji Milanovac as municipality celebrates its Patron day. It is Trinity, where on that day is being held pageant. Locals are advocating to build a mini cable car system for Rudnik and biathlon stadium on the Ravna Gora, given that project had failed during the 90's economical and international political problems of Yugoslavia and Serbia as a federal republic.

Geography and infrastructure

Gornji Milanovac lies between mountains Rudnik to the north and Vujan to the south. Relief of this area is hilly and mountainous. Gornji Milanovac with all his territory is located between these mountains: Rudnik, Maljen, Jesevac, Suvobor, Rajac and Vujan. Gornji Milanovac boundaries with: Ljig (on the North) and Mionica (on North-West), Topola and Aranđelovac (both on the North-East) Čačak (on the South) and Lučani (on the South West), Požega, Serbia (on the West), Kragujevac (on the East) and Knić (on theSouth-East).

The center of the city is situated along the western side of European route E763 (motorway), between the cities Ljig to the north and Čačak to the south and the villages Majdan to the north and Preljina to the south.

Main city crossroad branches:
To the North, onto road Gornji Milanovac-Kragujevac (see Kragujevac) that crosses with E763 and turns East; the nearest village on the road is Donja Vrbava.
To the East, turns South then East through the city, crosses E763 and then goes south through the village of Donja Trepča onto the route 23.
To the South, towards E763.
To the West, quickly turns North and after  branches into road Gornji Milanovac-Čestobrodica (see Čestobrodica) to the West; the nearest village on the road is Takovo, where Takovo Uprising begun; and into Road Gornji Milanovac – Donji Banjani (see Gornji Banjani) to the North; the nearest village on the road is Kalimanići; 
South of Milanovac, villages Brdjani to the West and Prislonica to the East are connected to E763 with local roads

On the West and Southside of municipalities is situated A2 highway (Corridor XI), opened for traffic in 2016; this is the most primary project on the field of transport and tourism in the future, providing Gornji Milanovac good connection to the coast of Adriatic Sea and Belgrade.

Rivers that flow through Gornji Milanovac are: Despotovica, Gruza, Dičina, Čemernica, and Kamenica. There is a variety of groundwater sources and thermo-mineral water sources like in village areas, like in: Svrackovci, Brdjani, Mlakovac, Trepca, and Savinac.

Gornji Milanovac is instructed to use civil and military airport in nearby Morava Airport-Lajdevci, Kraljevo , Belgrade Nikola Tesla Airport  and Užice-Ponikve Airport . Also, in September 2018, Swisslion-Takovo Concern established Heliport for business and civilian purpose. Gornji Milanovac does not have conditions for development of water traffic transportation. In 1969 narrow and regional railway Čačak-Gornji Milanovac – Topola was abolished because it was unprofitable. In 2014, Government of Serbia will consider the spatial plan of new electrified railways line Belgrade–Sarajevo, where Gornji Milanovac could be one of regional centers.

Climate
Gornji Milanovac has Humid continental climate. Mildest parts (Sub-Humid) of Gornji Milanovac are Brdjani, Trudelj and Dragolj. The coldest parts (humid) are peaks of Rudnik, Rajac, parts of villages Majdan, Svrackovci, Gojna Gora, Gornji Branetici, Brajic, Polom and in the north-west part of village Bogdanica. Moderately humid parts of the municipality are in parts of Majdan and the rest parts of mountain Rudnik, Rajac, and peaks of Suvobor.

Average daily (in %) humidity 78.5% during the year, in winter 85%, in summer periods 75% (excluding Rudnik mountain where it is 65%, which is good for relaxation and vacation). The hottest month of the year is July, and the coldest is January.

Minimum mean wind speed is 1.7–2.6 m/s (3.11–5.05 knots) and maximum 13.8–20.7 m/s (26.83–40.24 knots). This maximum speed occurs in the southeastern, southwestern and southern winds. On the territory of Gornji Milanovac prevails southeastern, northern and eastern winds.

Vegetation period lasts 220–260 days. During these period precipitation rate is 55% which is favorable for plants.

According to the last measuring of Air quality in 2019, the result was satisfying, because they showed an average of 35 US AQI to moderate quality 70 US AQI in the winter periods.

Annual average daily global sun radiation energy on a horizontal surface on territory of municipality Gornji Milanovac is between 3.8–4.0 kWh/m2 (0.33–0.35 BTU/ft 2). Daily mean values of the ambient dose rate ( background radiation) on the area around this municipality are ≈ 100 nSv/h.

Geology and vegetation
On the territory of Gornji Milanovac there is represented the following type of soil:
Brown acid soil-which is widespread in areas like Rudnik, from the west of Gruza river to Boljkovci;
Brown earth on serpentine-at Vujan, Suvobor and Maljen mountains;
Cambisol-in region of Lipovac, Prnjavor, Donja Crnuca, Belo Polje;
Brown earth on limestone- in area of Ravna Gora;
Brown earth on diabase-in region of Belo Polje, Gornja Vrbava, Donja Vrbava, Grabovica, Jablanica, in some village area like Brezovica, Rudnik, Zagradje, Gornji Branetici, Donji Branetici, and Ozrem.

According to Serbian Geology Institute, on Gornji Milanovac territory has solid reserves of Antimony, Mercury, Copper, Lead, Zinc and Gold (in small amounts).

Gornji Milanovac and the villages of Varnice, Zagradje, Dragolj and Trudelj are dominated by the Ostrvica Massif. Ostrvica is actually the remains of a destroyed volcanic cone. In May 2009, Ostrvica was declared a natural monument. In the middle of the last century, this massif was significant for its military fortifications and watchtower.

Land that is not cultivated makes 14.6%, arable land 47%, barren land makes 4.4%.
The erosion process was active in the past, which is why today some parts of the territory have barren land. These processes have caused the degradation of the land. According to the Republic Seismological Institution of Serbia, Gornji Milanovac is on the scale 8°-8.9° magnitude of an earthquake and the probability that this can happen once in 50–1000 years is 63%. In the major territory there is good protection from erosion process and solid protection from floods. The population doesn't have good protection from wind storms and radiation, but new standards in house and building construction stipulates even that. Most of the population has good thermal insulation in their homes and companies.

Forest vegetation is various: willow, poplar, oak, ash, etc. Forest plantations make 10% of his territory and 90% are natural wood. Meadow grass vegetation occupies 26,656 hectares (11,960 ft²) which is 32%, meadows 15% and grasslands 17%.

Terrain

The terrain of Gornji Milanovac is highland. Total terrain is divided by rivers Kamenica, Čemernica, Gruža, and Despotovica. It is of volcanic origin. Today the terrain is a result of the combined effects of tectonic movements and fluvial erosion processes in the past.

Morphological traits of municipalities, we can distinguish two different zones:
 Mountain rims of the south piedmonts on Maljen, Suvobor and south-western on Rudnik,
 Central-valley basin is characteristic of north-western parts and north of Ješevac and Vujan.

Dominant position in the municipality and Šumadija have mountain Rudnik. As the specific shape of terrain have Ostrvica which has a conical shape and it is positioned north-western from mountain and settlement Rudnik. Mountain massif Ješevac is positioned on the east side of the municipality. Mountain Vujan is lying southwards from river Despotovica to Brdjani pit. Western parts of the area covers Rajac, Suvobor and Maljen. Westernmost parts include Pranjani pit.

Demographics

According to the last official census done in 2011, the Municipality of Gornji Milanovac has 44,406 inhabitants. Population density on the territory of the municipality is 53.1 inhabitants per square kilometer. Since the census of 1981 when the total population was 50,651 people, there is a population decline due to the bad economic conditions in Serbia, negative natural increase rate and the majority of the older population. As of 2011, in Gornji Milanovac there are 637 migrants.

Estimated composition of population by sex and average age are:
Male- 21,802 (42.4 years) and
Female- 22,604 (43.7 years).

Ethnic groups
Ethnic composition of the municipality:

Religion structure of Gornji Milanovac as it follows in the table:

Mother tongue structure of Gornji Milanovac is displayed by the following table:

Economy and industry

1890 was significant as journalism began in this area. After World War I, Gornji Milanovac was connected with the other and important areas and cities in the Kingdom of Serbs, Croats, and Slovenes thanks to the narrow gauge railway. Before World War II the population was involved in mining, agronomy and with a few industrial workers (conditory and graphic-printing industry). During the World War II Gornji Milanovac was destroyed, but in the 1950s Gornji Milanovac begin with rapid progress, the rest of SFR Yugoslavia called this area an economic miracle.

In that time there were established two industrial zones (in the South and South-West parts). Companies and corporations that were established in these zones were: Zvezda (now known as Zvezda-Helios), Metalac, PIK Takovo (now known as Swisslion-Takovo), MK Rudnik (Fashion Stationery), FAD (automotive parts for all European cars), Tipoplastika (plastics, paper production), Metal Seko (now known as Mersteel), GRO Graditelj (construction company), Minos (railway equipment), Rudnik Flotation (mining production), Dečje novine (popular youth newspaper and publisher in SFR Yugoslavia), Proleter (department store), Kablar (cooperative agronomy company), Sigma (cardboard producer), Šipad Sarajevo-Gornji Milanovac (construction carpentry), Imlek (dairy products; subsidiary), Mlinsko-Pekarska Industrija Beograd (food industry; subsidiary), JTv Gornji Milanovac (local broadcasting company), KDS "Despotovica" (cable TV distribution systems).

Gornji Milanovac in the '80s and '90s was a real "nursery" of a mixed economy. Despite the 90's break up of SFR Yugoslavia and UN sanctions, Gornji Milanovac was the only city in that time in newly formed FR Yugoslavia whose companies were operated with a profit. New date companies are: "9. Septembar", "Tetra Pak", "Papir Print", "Spektar", "Flint Group Balkan", "Planeta računari", "FOKA", "S-group", "Semix Techno", "Interplet Gradnja", "Rapid", "AzVirt", "Rolopast", "RM Pak", "RGM Pak", "Apex", "MetalMont","Kej komerc", "Neven","Agrouniverzal", DAM 93", "RP Štamparija", "PCM Graf", "CIS Ecopoint", "Maksimil", "Jomla Group","Digitel", "Alfa Support", etc.

After 2001 and 2002, most workers organizations (that was the name for companies who were state and/or workers owned) from a period of 1950–1990 (mentioned above) were privatized. Only a few bankrupted: GRO Graditelj, Mlinsko-Pekarska Industrija Beograd (subsidiary), Imlek (subsidiary), Dečje novine, Minos and JTv Gornji Milanovac.

Here department stores, two mini-supermarkets, elegant boutiques, and restaurants can be found. Also, there is 1 flea markets, where local farmers are selling vegetables, products and 1 market of farm animals.

Today Gornji Milanovac valid for the biggest exporter of goods, services and products in the Republic of Serbia and one of the few cities and municipalities with the budget surplus. During the period of June 2014 unemployment rate in Gornji Milanovac was 25.28%. Most of municipality economy relies on:
 329 Small business,
 22 Medium size business,
 9 Big business.

Human Poverty Index (HPI) in Gornji Milanovac, according to the 2011 Census of the Republic of Serbia and World Bank is 24.00%, while GINI ratio is 0.336 and Poverty gap index is 0.039.

Economic preview
The following table gives a preview of total number of registered people employed in legal entities per their core activity (as of 2018):

Community services and Territorial organizations

Education

Gornji Milanovac has four primary schools: OŠ "Sveti Sava", OŠ Desanka Maksimović, OŠ "Kralj Aleksandar I" (before "Takovski-Partizanski bataljon") and OŠ "Momčilo Nastasijević". Also it has one high school: Gimnazija "Takovski ustanak. 
Two professional schools (four or three-year): ETŠ "Knjaz Miloš" and TŠ "Jovan Žujović". As regard as kindergarten and nurseries in this municipality there is three of these.

Gornji Milanovac had one department for higher education from Novi Sad, which was private owned and this department dissolved. In future periods was planned to open new departments of University of Kragujevac Faculty of Economics for business administration, taxes and accounting. Also and Faculty of Architecture University of Belgrade had negotiations about opening new departments for local students.

Health protection
Health protection in Gornji Milanovac is widespread on all territory. Citizens can reach basic health protection even in rural parts of municipality. Health care is organized like: General Hospital, Neurology Hospital, Gynaecology department, Intensive care unit, Labour health protection unit (there are departmans and units in two industrial zones), Surgical and physiatrically department, Dentistry, Dermatology, Psychiatric ward, Rehabilitation services, Village Health Protection Units and Physical therapy. Common support units include a dispensary, pathology, and radiology, and on the non-medical side, there are medical records departments, release of information departments, financial and HR department, Patient lawyers, Clinical Engineering, Facilities Management, Dining Services and Security Departments. There is an emergency service in place. On the property of Gornji Milanovac Hospital, there is built infrastructure for mini spa and rehabilitation center for skin and musculoskeletal diseases from watter resources, mentioned above (see section Geography and Infrastructure). As for health protection of animals, Gornji Milanovac has several privately owned veterinary stations.

Media broadcasting

"Dečje novine" was the famous and largest publishing house of books, comics, magazines and sticker albums in former Yugoslavia, based in this municipality. They had exclusive copyrights to publish comics of Walt Disney, Marvel and DC Comics. This publisher bankrupted in the 90's and then the remains of company assets were divided among creditors. Creditors established new companies in the sector of publishing books, newspapers, design and art, graphical services and enigmatic-revival editions. But these independent companies did not have the same success as "Dečje novine" had.

This town had 3 private owned radio stations and 1 local broadcasting station. In the '80s at Gornji Milanovac was established experimental radio station for travelers highway information services and among the first cable television systems in Yugoslavia, called Cable Distributive Systems "Despotovica". Due to the technological advancements, this radio station was called off during 1990. At the time of NATO bombing of Yugoslavia (during 1999), former JTv Gornji Milanovac broadcast television and radio signal to the world (because Radio Television of Serbia was bombed and destroyed on April 23, 1999.) for the short time until NATO air force bombed radio and television repeater at mountain Rudnik and nearby Kablar. Now Gornji Milanovac has 2 radio stations, "Gogi" and "Stari Milanovac" radio local broadcasting company, which both broadcasts folk music, information, and news in the Serbian language.  Meanwhile, the radio station "Stari Milanovac" bankrupted.

Until 2014, Gornji Milanovac did not have television broadcasting, after series of unsuccessful privatization of former JTv Gornji Milanovac. Now, this municipality has regional television and cable television broadcasting company "Telemark Systems". Telemark bought old cable television KDS Despotovica. This television company provides: cable television, regional television broadcasting for several municipalities ( besides Gornji Milanovac there are providing in Čačak, Lučani, Arilje, Požega, Kosjerić and Kraljevo), broadband internet, IT services, advertising services, fixed telephony, MMDS, dealership of digital and cable TV equipment and other services. Also, Gornji Milanovac has newspaper company "Takovske Novine", while "GM Press" bankrupted. In 2019, Telekom Srbija bought Telemark Systems and municipality Gornji Milanovac wanted new business partners for joint ventures in the media area. In August 2019, license for television media coverage is given to newly formed RTV GM Info Group.

Territorial organisation
There is one police station, Ministry of Internal Affairs of Serbia administration unit, Military post, Post office, branch of FedEx for Serbia, Customs substation and Fire-Rescuers department. The settlements are organized as Council of Settlements and Gornji Milanovac is divided into 63 settlements. Each of them has responsibility (infrastructure, election/referendum, and legal obligations) for that part of the territory.

Settlements
Aside from the town of Gornji Milanovac, the municipality of Gornji Milanovac includes the following 60 settlements and 3 smaller towns :

 Belo Polje 
 Beršići
 Bogdanica
 Boljkovci
 Brajići
 Brdjani
 Brezna
 Brezovica
 Brusnica
 Varnice
 Velereč
 Vrnčani
 Gojna Gora
 Gornja Vrbava
 Gornja Crnuća
 Gornji Banjani
 Gornji Branetići
 Grabovica
 Davidovica
 Donja Vrbava
 Donja Crnuća
 Donji Branetići
 Dragolj
 Drenova
 Družetići
 Zagradje
 Jablanica
 Kalimanići
 Kamenica
 Klatičevo
 Koštunići
 Kriva Reka
 Leušići
 Lipovac
 Lozanj
 Ločevci
 Lunjevica
 Ljevaja
 Ljutovnica
 Majdan
 Mutanj
 Nakucani
 Nevade
 Ozrem
 Polom
 Pranjani
 Prnjavor
 Reljinci
 Rudnik
 Ručići
 Svračkovci
 Semedraž
 Sinoševići
 Srezojevci
 Takovo
 Teočin
 Trudelj
 Ugrinovci
 Cerova
 Šarani
 Šilopaj

Judicial system and safety

Gornji Milanovac from its establishment had modern district court. Today it has Basic People Court and Magistrates Court. Also, it is among the safest municipalities in Serbia. According to National Statistical Institute of Serbia in 2013 Gornji Milanovac had 148 convicted adults and 16 juvenile. Safety index of this municipality is among the highest than in other municipalities in Serbia 98.63%.

Politics
According to the Law on Local Self-Government head of municipality (for this status they need population 10,000–99,000 citizens) is called "president" and for larger cities (100,000 and above population), they are called "mayors". Gornji Milanovac has/had 29 presidents in his history. In the following table are named presidents and not precise dates of their mandate:

Flag, Motto, and Coat of Arms 
First adopted representative solution for Gornji Milanovac was at the beginning of the '60s, with gray flag and complex emblem which consist of green and white colors. Symbols and colors are : 
 Green and white was supposed to represent a clean environment with butterfly in the center of emblem,
 In the circle was put Serbian Cyrillic letter "Г (G)", which stands for first initial for "Gornji" and outside is also Serbian Cyrillic letter "M" which stands for the second initial of "Milanovac",
 Gear wheel with number 1853 (which symbolized year of foundation) at the bottom, which supposed to symbolized economical-financial and overall progress of Gornji Milanovac and his people:

The second adopted solution was adopted after the 2000s.  This Coat of Arms and Flag was a political and heraldic problem between Socialists Party of Serbia on one side and other political organizations in this municipality on the other side. It was adopted three times: 2000–2004 (municipality government led by DOS), last quarter of 2004–2008 (municipality government led by DSS, SRS, NS, SPO, G17+, DS, LDP) and 2016–present (municipality government led by SNS, NS, PUPS, PS, SDPS and ZS). This coat of arms consists of two lions (red who is holding Serbian civil flag and yellow who is holding the flag of the municipality) with crowns and swords which represented royalty through history and courage of the citizens. In the center of the coat of arms it is positioned heater shield with golden oak and red cross in the middle of the shield. The purpose of these two symbols is to represent ancestors on this lands and red cross to represent rebellion flag from the Second Serbian Uprising and " Zapis" or literally inscription who were there in the moment of gathering all rebellions in that time. Above the heater shield is a stone crown which represents forts and the city history. The flag is a blue background with a wreath of willow flowers and nettle leaves which symbolizes Palm Sunday (on that holiday April 24, 1815, Serbian rebels gathered and begin the Second Serbian Uprising) and Serbian custom of knitting wreaths for health, luck and love purpose. In the center of the flag is a white background with red Greek Orthodox Cross which symbolizes above mentioned Second Serbian Uprising flag. The motto is positioned on the bottom of this coat of arms: ,, Време и моје право (Time and my right)".

The third adopted solution is now replaced emblem and flag of Gornji Milanovac. It is also and the flag of a political coalition called "Pokret za opštinu Gornji Milanovac-POGM (Movement for Municipality of Gornji Milanovac)". The flag is white with some form of inverted Iberian shield. In the shield there are territorial map of municipality as treetop (positioned with blue background which represents sky), in the middle is oak stump which also symbolizes Zapis and Second Serbian Uprising (positioned with green background which represents grass and clean environment) and on the bottom of this emblem, there is inscription "Општина Горњи Милановац (Municipality of Gornji Milanovac)" (positioned in brown background, which represent fertile soil. First flag version of the municipality, in the period of 2004–2008 was a horizontally oriented flag with red, blue and gold colors. In the center of this first solution flag was wreath and Paja Jovanović's painting of Second Serbian Uprising in the center of it. This first solution was abolished and replaced with the second version and also the flag of a political movement. First version was approved for ceremonial purpose. The motto of the municipality was:,, Усудити се, то је цена успеха (Venture is the price of success)".

In the November 2016, new municipality authorities adopted Statute of Municipality Gornji Milanovac with previous, second solution. Problems about flag, motto and coat of arms is in political nature. Above mention political Movement of Municipality Gornji Milanovac is adopting the third solution (now previous emblem). In the 2008 opposition parties suggest referendum about Municipality Statute, but referendum never held. Litigation continues even today and remains to see the next composition of municipality authorities.

Twin towns — sister cities

Gornji Milanovac is twinned with:

 Blagoevgrad, Bulgaria
 Edessa, Greece
 Kavadarci, North Macedonia
 Kumanovo, North Macedonia
 Nowogard, Poland
 Pleven, Bulgaria
 Slavonska Požega, Croatia
 Slovenj Gradec, Slovenia
 Staro Nagoričane, North Macedonia
 Starodub, Russia
 Starše, Slovenia
 Trebinje, Bosnia and Herzegovina
 Vefsn, Norway
 Vlasenica, Bosnia and Herzegovina

Sport

The most popular sport in the city, besides Basketball, Handball and Volleyball, is definitely football (soccer). The governing body for the sport is Sportski Savez Opštine Gornji Milanovac (engl. Sport Union of Municipality Gornji Milanovac-SSOGM). Besides New Metalac Stadium, Gornji Milanovac have: Sport Hall "Breza" (multi-purpose); Indoors Sport Swimming pool "Tipoplastika" (currently under reconstruction); Sport and recreative centers for workers, students and public in industry zones of Tipoplastika, Autoprevoz and Swisslion-Takovo companies; Outdoors Olympic pool; two sport halls in Pranjani and at Rudnik; Sport Hall in Primary schools at Gornji Milanovac; two bowling hall (one at Metalac Stadium and one in area of professional school "Jovan Žujović"); one beach soccer (football) and volleyball ground; Ice skating rink and one outdoors gym (nearby Sport Hall "Breza"); and "Takovo" Stadium (multipurpose).

Notable sport society from Gornji Milanovac are shown in following table:

Also there are multisport activities and organizations in this municipality. Such as: DTV Partizan (physical training club for children/school children and workers) and four junior football (soccer) clubs: "Poletarac", "Junior soccer", "Srpski orlovi" and "Sportic". As far as municipality association football (soccer) league, Gornji Milanovac has 12 members: Majdan, Jablanica, Šumadija, Ozrem PMH, Šilopaj, Velereč '94, Ozremica, Mladi Rudar, Mladost '09, Takovski ustanak, Brezak, Sparta Grabovica and Omladinac. Every municipality football senior game is well covered by local residents. In Morava District league (5th level in Serbian Football league system) there are some Gornji Milanovac clubs, as: FK Napredak Svračkovci, FK Backovac United, FK Donja Vrbava and FK Lunjevica.

Notable people
This municipality has numerous of deserving citizens who have contributed to the progress of Serbia and Yugoslavia.

 
 Hadži-Prodan Gligorijević, Serbian military commander in First Serbian Uprising
 Jovan Žujović, anthropologist, a founder of geology in Serbia
 Mija Aleksić, Serbian actor
 Momčilo Nastasijević, a Serbian poet and novelist
 Uroš Petrović, literate
 Bjesovi, alternative rock band
 Snežana Đurišić, Serbian and Yugoslavian folk singer
 Čedomir Mirković, Serbian writer and editor
 Draga Mašin,  queen and wife of King Aleksandar Obrenović of the Kingdom of Serbia
 Ljubica Vukomanović, Princess consort of the Principality of Serbia, wife of Miloš Obrenović
 Jelena Abbou, née Jelena Djordjevic Fitness and figure competition
 Dragan Todorović, Serbian politician and president of political party "Istočna alternativa (East Alternative)"
 Milomir Marić, Serbian journalist, writer, and television presenter
 Bojan Dimitrijević, Serbian politician and ex-minister of Trade, Tourism, and Services in the Serbian government
 Dragiša Vasić, Serbian and Yugoslavian lawyer, writer, publicist, soldier
 Arsenije Loma, Serbian duke during the First and Second Serbian Uprising of the Serbian revolution
 Ljubica Otašević, Serbian and Yugoslavian actor and women basketball player
 Čedomir Mirković,  writer and critic
 Uroš Petrović, poet
 Dobrica Matković, chief of the Royal Department for State Protection and Ban of Danube

References

External links

 Official site
 GM032.net Internet Portal of the Municipality of Gornji Milanovac
 Tourist Organisation of the Municipality of Gornji Milanovac
 Weather forecast for Gornji Milanovac

 
Populated places in Moravica District
Šumadija
Municipalities and cities of Šumadija and Western Serbia